The past tense is a verb tense expressing action, activity, state or being in the past.

Past Tense may also refer to:
 Past Tense (1994 film), a 1994 made-for-TV mystery starring Scott Glenn and Lara Flynn Boyle
 Past Tense (2006 film), a mystery starring Paula Trickey
 Past Tense (2014 film), a 2014 Philippine romantic comedy-drama film
 "Past Tense" (Star Trek: Deep Space Nine), 1995 pair of episodes of Star Trek
 "Past Tense" (Venture Bros. episode)
 Short Trips: Past Tense, a 2004 Big Finish original anthology edited by Ian Farrington and based on the British television series Doctor Who
 Past Tense (novel), a novel by Lee Child
 "Past Tense", a song by Meshuggah on their album Immutable